The 380th Expeditionary Operations Group) is the operational flying component of the United States Air Force 380th Air Expeditionary Wing. It is a provisional unit stationed at Al Dhafra Air Base, United Arab Emirates, and is assigned to the United States Air Forces Central component of Air Combat Command.

The unit was first activated in 1991 at Plattsburgh Air Force Base, New York as the 380th Wing's operational element.  It managed the wing's tankers until the fall of 1994, when flying operations at Plattsburgh ended in preparation for the base's closure in response to the 1993 BRAC recommendations

Overview
The 380 EOG conducts combat air refueling, airborne C2, and ISR in a joint and coalition environment. Its component squadrons are:
 Detachment 1
 380th Expeditionary Operations Support Squadron
 908th Expeditionary Air Refueling Squadron (KC-10 Extender)
 968th Expeditionary Airborne Air Control Squadron (E-3 Sentry)
 Expeditionary Fighter Squadron (F-15C)
 159th Expeditionary Fighter Squadron, Florida Air National Guard, from Jacksonville International Airport, FL.
 Expeditionary Fighter Squadron (F-15E)
336th Expeditionary Fighter Squadron from Seymour Johnson Air Force Base (June 2019 – November 2019)
 494th Expeditionary Fighter Squadron from RAF Lakenheath (October 2019 – 2020)
 Expeditionary Fighter Squadron (F-22A)
 94th Expeditionary Fighter Squadron from Joint Base Langley–Eustis
 Expeditionary Fighter Squadron (F-35)
 4th Expeditionary Fighter Squadron from Hill Air Force Base (April 2019 -)

History
The group was activated at Plattsburgh Air Force Base, New York and assigned to the 380th Air Refueling Wing in 1991. This was because Strategic Air Command (SAC) was reorganizing its wings under the Objective Wing Organization.  When it was disestablished the following year, the group became part of Air Mobility Command.  This assignment did not last long, for the 1993 Base Realignment and Closure Commission recommended the closure of Plattsburgh AFB and the group was inactivated in October 1994.

The group was reactivated and redesignated as the 380th Expeditionary Operations Group in early 2002 to support the War in Afghanistan. The group participated in Operation Enduring Freedom focused on Afghanistan; and the Iraq War from 2003, including the Iraqi Civil War (2014–2017), which the U.S. Department of Defense codenamed Operation Iraqi Freedom and Operation New Dawn.

Lineage
 Established as the 380th Operations Group on 29 August 1991
 Activated on 1 September 1991
 Inactivated on 1 October 1994
 Redesignated 380th Expeditionary Operations Group and converted to provisional status on 4 December 2001
 Redesignated as 380th Expeditionary Operations Group in early 2002 and activated.

Assignments
 380th Air Refueling Wing, 1 September 1991 – 1 October 1994
 Air Combat Command to activate or inactivate as needed after 4 December 2001
 380th Air Expeditionary Wing, c. January 2002–present

Units
 12th Expeditionary Reconnaissance Squadron: 2002-Undetermined
 908th Expeditionary Air Refueling Squadron: 2002-Undetermined
 964th Expeditionary Airborne Air Control Squadron: 2002-Undetermined
 99th Expeditionary Reconnaissance Squadron: 2002-Undetermined
 380th Expeditionary Operations Support Squadron: 2002-Undetermined

Stations
 Plattsburgh Air Force Base, New York, 1 September 1991 – 1 October 1994
 Al Dhafra Air Base, United Arab Emirates, c. January 2002 – present

Aircraft
 KC-135R/T Stratotanker, 1991–1994, 2002-Undetermined
 KC-10A Extender, 2002-Undetermined

References

Citations

Bibliography
 Fain, James E.(ed.). The History of the 380th Bomb Group (H), AAF, Affectionately Known as the Flying Circus, November 1942 – September 1945. New York: Commandy-Roth Co., 1946.
 Horton, Glenn R., Jr. The Best in the Southwest: The 380th Bomb Group in World War II. Savage, Minnesota: Mosie Publications, 1995.
 King of the Heavies – 380th Bomb Group, 1942–1945, by Glenn R. Horton, Jr., and Gary L. Horton. Library of Congress Card Number 83–90348. Privately published, 1983, 184 pp.
 Maurer, Maurer (1983). Air Force Combat Units of World War II. Maxwell AFB, Alabama: Office of Air Force History. .
 Williams, Theodore J., and Gotham, Barbara J., WE WENT TO WAR: A WWII Wartime Roster of the 380th Bombardment Group (H), PART II: A Roster of the Flight Crews of the 380th Bomb Group (H), published by Theodore J. Williams, West Lafayette, Indiana, September 1999.
 Williams, Theodore J., Gotham, Barbara J., and Goble, Sue, WE WENT TO WAR: A WWII Wartime Roster of the 380th Bombardment Group (H), PART IV: A Listing of MOS/SSNs (Military Occupational Specialties/Service Speciality Numbers) Which Personnel of an Isolated Heavy Bombardment Group Would Probably Need During WWII, published by Theodore J. Williams, West Lafayette, Indiana, September 1999.
 Williams, Theodore J., and Gotham, Barbara J., WE WENT TO WAR: A WWII Wartime Roster of the 380th Bombardment Group (H), PART VII: Keep 'Em Flying, published by Theodore J. Williams, West Lafayette, Indiana, September 2004.
 Williams, Theodore J., and Gotham, Barbara J., WE WENT TO WAR: A WWII Wartime Roster of the 380th Bombardment Group (H), PART X: Why We Were in the Southwest Pacific Area:  A Review, published by Theodore J. Williams, West Lafayette, Indiana, October 2006.
 Williams, Theodore J., and Gotham, Barbara J., WE WENT TO WAR: A WWII Wartime Roster of the 380th Bombardment Group (H), PART XI: Our Opposition ~ Japanese Anti-Aircraft Artillery and Fighter Units in the Southwest Pacific, published by Theodore J. Williams, West Lafayette, Indiana, March 2007.
 380th.org
 380th Expeditionary Operations Group Factsheet

External links

 The 380th Bomb Group Association
 The 380th Bomb Group from the 5th Air Force History
 380 History
 Snowflakes in the Desert, Airman Magazine, March 2004
 Deployed wing counts down to ‘The Move’

Operations groups of the United States Air Force
Air expeditionary groups of the United States Air Force